The Teem Plaza is a twin tower complex in Tianhe District, Guangzhou, China that consists of 45-storey,  Teem Tower, a 38-storey Sheraton Hotels and Resorts-branded hotels, and a shopping mall. Construction of Teem Plaza was completed in 2008.

Tenants
Google Guangzhou: Unit 3007, Teemtower

See also
 List of tallest buildings in Guangzhou

References

External links

Skyscraper office buildings in Guangzhou
Tourist attractions in Guangzhou
Twin towers
Retail buildings in China
Skyscraper hotels in Guangzhou
Skyscrapers in Guangzhou